Murshida Khatun (born 7 July 1999) is a Bangladeshi cricketer who plays as a left-handed batter. She was named in Bangladeshi squad for the 2017 Women's Cricket World Cup Qualifier. She made her Women's One Day International cricket (WODI) debut against South Africa on 4 May 2018. She made her WT20I debut for Bangladesh against South Africa Women on 20 May 2018.

In August 2019, she was named in Bangladesh's squad for the 2019 ICC Women's World Twenty20 Qualifier tournament in Scotland. In November 2019, she was named in Bangladesh's squad for the cricket tournament at the 2019 South Asian Games. The Bangladesh team beat Sri Lanka by two runs in the final to win the gold medal.

In January 2020, she was named in Bangladesh's squad for the 2020 ICC Women's T20 World Cup in Australia. In November 2021, she was named in Bangladesh's team for the 2021 Women's Cricket World Cup Qualifier tournament in Zimbabwe. In January 2022, she was named in Bangladesh's team for the 2022 Commonwealth Games Cricket Qualifier tournament in Malaysia. Later the same month, she was named in Bangladesh's team for the 2022 Women's Cricket World Cup in New Zealand.

References

External links

1999 births
Living people
Bangladeshi women cricketers
Bangladesh women One Day International cricketers
Bangladesh women Twenty20 International cricketers
South Asian Games gold medalists for Bangladesh
South Asian Games medalists in cricket
Sylhet Division women cricketers
Northern Zone women cricketers